John Randolph Kuhl Jr. (born April 19, 1943) is an American Republican politician. He is a former member of the New York State Assembly, the New York State Senate, and the United States House of Representatives. Kuhl represented New York's 29th congressional district for two terms before being defeated for reelection by Eric Massa in 2008.

Early life and education 
Kuhl was born in Hammondsport, New York. He graduated from Union College in Schenectady, New York with a B.A. in civil engineering in 1966, and then got a J.D. degree from Syracuse University College of Law in 1969. He was admitted to the New York Bar in 1970.

New York State Legislature
 Kuhl was a member of the New York Assembly from 1981 to 1986, sitting in the 184th, 185th and 186th New York State Legislatures. In November 1986, after the retirement of William T. Smith, Kuhl ran for Smith's Senate seat and won.

Kuhl was a member of the New York State Senate from 1987 to 2004, sitting in the 187th, 188th, 189th, 190th, 192nd, 193rd, 194th, 195th and 196th New York State Legislatures. He was appointed the Senate's Assistant Majority Leader for Operations at the beginning of the 1995 legislative session.

One of Kuhl's signature issues in the state legislature was Upstate secession. He regularly introduced a bill "to let New York City, Long Island and Westchester and Rockland Counties became a separate state called New York; the rest of the counties would become West New York. At least one poll in upstate has found the idea to be wildly popular." Kuhl summed up his secessionist views by saying that "his constituents in the Finger Lakes region often wonder, 'Why don't you just cut the City of New York off and let it drift out to sea?'"

In 1997, while serving as a state senator, Kuhl was arrested and convicted of driving while intoxicated. His driver's license was revoked for six months.

House of Representatives

2004 election 
In 2004, Kuhl ran for the House seat of retiring U.S. Representative Amo Houghton, a Republican multimillionaire who had displayed a moderate bent during 18 years in Washington. In the Republican primary, Kuhl, who was supported by Houghton, defeated Monroe County Legislator Mark Assini. He then defeated 27-year-old Democrat Samara Barend in the general election.

2006 election 

Kuhl's Democratic opponent in the 2006 elections was former Navy officer Eric Massa of Corning, a former Republican.

In March 2006, Kuhl invited President George W. Bush to Canandaigua. In September 2006, Kuhl welcomed Vice President Dick Cheney to a major fundraiser in Rochester. Kuhl agreed with Cheney's assessment that combating terrorists around the world was the top issue in the campaign. According to Kuhl, bad news from the war zone should be countered by a frank discussion of reality. Regarding his Finger Lakes and Southern Tier constituents, Kuhl said, "They don't necessarily understand the full importance of our presence there".

Preliminary results from the November election showed Kuhl narrowly beating Massa by a margin of approximately 5,600 votes (out of about 193,000 cast). Massa had initially refused to concede the election and was expected to file a challenge, but on November 15, 2006 Massa conceded the election and contacted Kuhl to congratulate him. According to the final election results, which were certified by the New York State Board of Elections on December 14, 2006, Kuhl won by a margin of 6,033 votes (out of 206,121 cast).

2008 election

Kuhl's again faced Democratic nominee and former Navy officer Eric Massa, losing the rematch by a narrow 51%-49% margin, roughly reversing the outcome of the 2006 elections. Kuhl finished behind Massa in Cattaraugus County, a county Kuhl carried by a 56%-44% margin in 2006 (and one that voted for Presidential candidate John McCain in 2008), likely contributing to the loss. Because the race was so close, Kuhl did not concede the election until November 21, 2008.

Political positions 
Kuhl was considered a fairly reliable conservative who generally voted against abortion rights, gun control and tax increases. He was, however, a member of the Republican Main Street Partnership.

Kuhl supported making then-President Bush's tax cuts permanent. In addition, he also advocated for a 10-cent reduction in federal gasoline taxes.

In September 2007, Kuhl was noted in the news as being one of the most outspoken opponents of a plan by then-New York Governor Eliot Spitzer to allow illegal aliens to apply for driver's licenses. He also became a prominent opponent of the SCHIP expansion, a stance for which he earned significant animosity from various groups including MoveOn, the Service Employees International Union, and even former New York Governor Eliot Spitzer.

During his time as a state senator, Kuhl was an advocate of New York City secession and unsuccessfully introduced several bills to separate Upstate New York from downstate.

References

External links

 Congressman Randy Kuhl official campaign site
 Federal Election Commission – John Kuhl campaign finance reports and data
 On the Issues – Randy Kuhl issue positions and quotes
 OpenSecrets.org – John R. Kuhl Jr campaign contributions
 Project Vote Smart – Representative John R. 'Randy' Kuhl Jr. (NY) profile
 
 Washington Post – Congress Votes Database: Randy Kuhl voting record

1943 births
Living people
Republican Party New York (state) state senators
Republican Party members of the New York State Assembly
Union College (New York) alumni
Syracuse University College of Law alumni
Republican Party members of the United States House of Representatives from New York (state)
People from Hammondsport, New York
21st-century American politicians